Corrado Racca (November 14, 1889 – May 12, 1950) was an Italian actor and voice actor.

Biography
Corrado began his career on stage when he moved to Florence in 1908. He later worked alongside other stage actors such as Ruggero Ruggeri, Emma Gramatica and Italia Almirante Manzini. On the radio, he acted for the Ente Italiano per le Audizioni Radiofoniche in Rome since the early 1930s. On screen, Racca appeared in more than twenty films during his career. He played the male lead in the 1933 film Villafranca.

Racca also worked as a voice actor, dubbing international films for release in Italy. He worked for the Cooperativa Doppiatori Cinematografici and he often dubbed actors such as Edward G. Robinson, Walter Huston, Henry Travers, Charles Bickford, Donald Crisp, Gene Lockhart and many more in some of their films.

Filmography

Cinema
 Villafranca (1934)
 The Blind Woman of Sorrento (1934)
 Ettore Fieramosca (1938)
 Cardinal Messias (1939)
 The King's Jester (1941)
 Girl of the Golden West (1942)
 Malombra (1942)

Dubbing roles

Live action
Roger Enright in The Fountainhead
Rowlie in Lassie Come Home
Looking Glass in Across the Wide Missouri
John, Count of Luxembourg in Joan of Arc
Swan Bostrom in Come and Get It
Roy Bean in The Westerner
Kris Barden in Blood on the Moon
Clarence Odbody in It's a Wonderful Life
Ray Collins in The Magnificent Ambersons
Count Dracula in Abbott and Costello Meet Frankenstein
Louis J. Prescott in The Sea Wolf
Prince John in The Adventures of Robin Hood
Job Skeffington in Mr. Skeffington
Dr. Paul Carruthers in The Devil Bat
Carl in Casablanca
Sir Guy Charteris in The Shanghai Gesture
Charlie Chan in Charlie Chan at the Olympics
Howard in The Treasure of the Sierra Madre
Pardon Board Chairman in Call Northside 777
Sam Pierce in Duel in the Sun
Dan Gallagher in The Informer
Art Dealer in Prince of Foxes
François Soubirous in The Song of Bernadette
John Triton in Night Has a Thousand Eyes
Pete Morgan in The Red House
Mr. Wilson in The Stranger
Scotty MacPherson in City for Conquest
Uncle Lazlo in Romance on the High Seas
Dan Cody in The Great Gatsby

References

Bibliography 
 Goble, Alan. The Complete Index to Literary Sources in Film. Walter de Gruyter, 1999.

External links 

 

1889 births
1950 deaths
Italian male film actors
Italian male voice actors
Italian male stage actors
Italian male radio actors
Italian male silent film actors
Actors from Bologna
20th-century Italian male actors